S. pentaphylla may refer to:

 Sophora pentaphylla, a pea with uncertain taxonomic status
 Succisa pentaphylla, a honeysuckle first described by Conrad Moench